Dondra Head Lighthouse is a lighthouse  located on Dondra Head, Dondra, the southernmost point in Sri Lanka and is Sri Lanka's tallest lighthouse, and also one of the tallest in South East Asia. Dondra Head lighthouse is operated and maintained by the Sri Lanka Ports Authority.

The name Dondra is a synonym for "Devi-Nuwara" in the local Sinhala language, "Devi" meaning "Gods" and "Nuwara" meaning "City". Dondra is therefore derived to mean "City of the Gods".

History 
Dondra Head Lighthouse was designed by Sir James Nicholas Douglass, with construction, by William Douglass of the Imperial Lighthouse Service, commencing in November 1887. All the building materials including the bricks and steel were imported from England. The granite rock was supplied from quarries at Dalbeattie in Scotland and Penryn in Cornwall. The lighthouse was completed and commissioned in March 1890. The combined cost of erection of the lighthouse and the Barberyn Lighthouse was £30,000 and was paid for by dues collected at the Basses lighthouses.

Lens
Dondra Head was one of a limited number of lighthouses that were designed to house the large Hyperradiant Fresnel lenses that became available at the end of the 19th century. Four of these lenses were used in Sri Lankan lights, all made by Chance Brothers in England.

The rotating lens however was removed in 2020 and replaced by a static flashing LED light which has reduced the visibility range of the lighthouse considerably.

Features 
Dondra Head is also one of four international lighthouse in Sri Lanka. It was modernized in 2000, with the introduction of a Differential Global Positioning System and is computer linked to the other major lighthouses around the coast.

See also

 List of lighthouses in Sri Lanka

References

External links

Dondra Head Light
Devinuwara Official web site
 Sri Lanka Ports Authority 
 Lighthouses of Sri Lanka

Lighthouses completed in 1889
Lighthouses in Sri Lanka
Buildings and structures in Matara District

ru:Дондра (мыс)